Prithvi is a 1997 Indian Hindi-language mystery film starring Sunil Shetty, Shilpa Shetty (in double role), Shakti Kapoor, Suresh Oberoi, Faraaz Khan
Shweta Menon. Actual director of the film was Deepak Shivdasani but Nithin Manmohan asked to leave the film between and Nithin took the place of director. First film of Suniel Shetty with Shilpa. Only film of Faraz Khan with Suniel Shetty as villain. Shilpa Shetty appeared second time in double role after Main Khiladi Tu Anari.

Cast
Sunil Shetty as Prithvi 
Shilpa Shetty as Rashmi /  Neha (dual roles)
Faraaz Khan as V. K.
Shweta Menon as Lucky
Shakti Kapoor as Dabu/Bellboy/Indian Embassy Staff/Club Waiter/Mental Patient/Sikh Man/Transgender (seven roles)
Suresh Oberoi as Dhanraj
Navin Nischol as Rashmi's father
Viju Khote as Movie Director

Summary
Prithvi (Sunil Shetty), a famous photographer, and Neha (Shilpa Shetty) fall in love and soon get married. Prithvi and Neha both fly to America for their honeymoon, but when Neha uses the bathroom at a restaurant, she gets kidnapped. Prithvi is very scared and would do anything to get Neha back. He takes the help of Lucky (Shweta Menon). When Prithvi was near a hospital, he finds Neha, but she has fainted, but once she wakes up, she does not recognize Prithvi. The girl he found was, in fact, a duplicate of Neha, whose name was Rashmi. Neha was threatened by her kidnapper (Faraaz Khan) as she should prove him as innocent for a murder case. Prithvi and Rashmi rush to the court and say that he is not innocent and has gotten a duplicate of the girl. Prithvi finds Neha, and they both live happily ever after.

Soundtrack
"Jis Ghadi Tujhko Tere", Anuradha's version, was very popular, but this song is available only on the audio track, not in the movie. "Een Meen Sade Teen" is partly lifted from Rendezvous 2''' by Jeanne Mitchell Jarre. The soundtrack also included 3 bonus songs composed by Sukhwinder Singh, none of which featured in the film.

Critical reception
Anupama Chopra of India Today called it a "passable fare". K.N. Vijiyin of New Straits Times'' opined that the film "is not all that bad".

External links

References

1997 action thriller films
1997 films
1990s Hindi-language films
1990s mystery thriller films
Films scored by Viju Shah
Films shot in the United States
Indian action thriller films
Indian mystery thriller films